Kinyongia magomberae, commonly known as the Magombera chameleon, is a species of chameleon. The holotype of this species was discovered inside the jaws of a twig snake in the Magombera Forest of Tanzania by Andrew Marshall of the University of York. The snake was startled by Marshall and dropped the chameleon, which was examined and discovered to be a new species. Although this particular specimen did not survive, another one was found which did survive.

References

Kinyongia
Reptiles of Tanzania
Reptiles described in 2009
Taxa named by Krystal A. Tolley
Taxa named by Colin R. Tilbury